The 2013–14 Cal Poly Mustangs men's basketball team represented California Polytechnic State University during the 2013–14 NCAA Division I men's basketball season. The Mustangs were led by fifth year head coach Joe Callero and played their home games at Mott Gym. They were members of the Big West Conference.

Cal Poly finished the regular season with a 10–19 record (6–10 Big West) and entered the Big West Conference tournament as the 7 seed. The Mustangs won the tournament to earn an automatic bid to their first NCAA tournament appearance in school history. After beating Texas Southern, they lost to Wichita State, 64–37, and finished 14–20.

Roster

Schedule
Source: 

|-
!colspan=9 style="background:#123C31; color:#FFF1D0;"| Non-conference games

|-
!colspan=9 style="background:#123C31; color:#FFF1D0;"| Conference games

|-
!colspan=9 style="background:#123C31; color:#FFF1D0;"| Big West tournament

|-
!colspan=9 style="background:#123C31; color:#FFF1D0;"| NCAA tournament

References

Cal Poly Mustangs men's basketball seasons
Cal Poly
Cal Poly Mustangs men's basketball team
Cal Poly Mustangs men's basketball team
Cal Poly